Leslie Maxwell Powell (13 April 1921 – 22 December 1999) was an Australian rules footballer who played with Fitzroy and Geelong in the Victorian Football League (VFL). 

Powell also served in the Australian Army during World War II.

Notes

External links 

1921 births
1999 deaths
Australian rules footballers from Victoria (Australia)
Fitzroy Football Club players
Geelong Football Club players
Newtown & Chilwell Football Club players
Australian Army personnel of World War II